Hariqan (also Romanized as Ḩarīqān; also known as Ḩareqān, Ḩarīfān, and Harighan) is a village in Kuhpayeh Rural District, Nowbaran District, Saveh County, Markazi Province, Iran. As of the 2006 census, its population was 81 with 28 families.

References 

Populated places in Saveh County